Polychrus gutturosus, also known as Berthold's bush anole or monkey tailed anole, is a species of lizard found in tropical Central and South America. It is sometimes referred to as a "forest iguana". It lives in forests and jungles from Honduras to Ecuador. This insectivorous lizard is a climbing species that can often be seen holding onto branches. It can even hold on with its hind legs, though it moves slowly that way.

Genus Polychrus is often classified in the family, Polychrotidae, but some prefer to treat it as a subfamily, Polychrotinae, under the family Iguanidae.

References

Polychrotidae
Lizards of South America
Lizards of Central America
Reptiles of Colombia
Reptiles of Costa Rica
Reptiles of Ecuador
Reptiles of Honduras
Reptiles of Nicaragua
Reptiles of Panama
Reptiles described in 1845
Taxa named by Arnold Adolph Berthold